Banksia meisneri subsp. meisneri is a subspecies of Banksia meisneri. It is native to the Southwest Botanical Province of Western Australia. As an autonym, it is defined as containing the type specimen of the species.

References
 
 
 

meisneri subsp. meisneri
Eudicots of Western Australia
Plant subspecies